Machaneng is a village in Central District of Botswana. The population was 2,050 in 2001 census.

The Botswana Prison Service (BPS) operates the Machaneng Prison.

It is served by Machaneng Airport.

References

Populated places in Central District (Botswana)
Villages in Botswana